Oceanic may refer to:

Of or relating to the ocean
Of or relating to Oceania
Oceanic climate
Oceanic languages
Oceanic person or people, also called "Pacific Islander(s)"

Places
Oceanic, Wrightsville Beach, North Carolina, a seafood restaurant with outdoor seating on the historic Crystal Pier.
Oceanic, British Columbia, a settlement on Smith Island, British Columbia, Canada
Oceanic, New Jersey, an unincorporated community within Rumson Borough, Monmouth County, New Jersey, United States

Ships named Oceanic
 , the White Star Line's first ocean liner
 , a transatlantic ocean liner built for the White Star Line
 , a project of the 1930s
 , built as SS Independence in 1950
 , also named Big Red Boat I by Premier Cruises

Art, entertainment, and media

Fictional entities
 Oceanic Airlines or Oceanic Airways, often used in disaster movies
 Oceanic Flight 815, a flight in the television series Lost

Literature
 "Oceanic" (novella), a 1998 sci-fi novella by Greg Egan

Music
Artists
 Oceanic (band), a 1990s UK dance/house act

Albums
 Oceanic (Isis album)
 Oceanic (Vangelis album)
 Oceanic, Emil Bulls album

Symphonies
 Oceanic days, Sunleif Rasmussen's Symphony no. 1

Businesses
Oceanic Bank of Nigeria
Oceanic Time Warner Cable, a division of Time Warner Cable based in Hawaii
Oceanic Worldwide, a manufacturer of scuba gear
Oceanic, a French electronics brand since 1934

Psychology
Oceanic feeling, of "being one with the external world as a whole"

Sports
 Rimouski Oceanic, a franchise of the Quebec Major Junior Hockey League in Canada

See also
 Ocean (disambiguation)
 Oceania (disambiguation)
 Oceanus (disambiguation)

Language and nationality disambiguation pages